WDXC is a Country-formatted broadcast radio station licensed to Pound, Virginia, serving Clintwood, Norton, and Wise in Virginia and Jenkins and Whitesburg in Kentucky. WDXC is owned and operated by WDXC Radio, Inc.

References

External links
 102.3 Kickin' Country Online
 

1979 establishments in Virginia
Country radio stations in the United States
Radio stations established in 1979
DXC
Wise County, Virginia